Oslo University Hospital, Ullevål, formerly Ullevål University Hospital in Oslo, Norway is the largest of the four main campuses of Oslo University Hospital. It was opened in 1887, and was an independent hospital owned by Oslo municipality and then by the state until it became part of Oslo University Hospital in 2009. It is a Level I trauma center and includes patient treatment, research, teaching and administration activities. The headquarters of Oslo University Hospital is located at Ullevål.

Oslo Heliport, Ullevål  is a helipad with a  diameter located on the top of a parking garage. It has a walkway to the emergency department. The helipad features a fuel tank.

See also
Oslo University Hospital, Aker University of Oslo Oslo University Hospital Ullevål sykehus tram stop

References

External links 

Official website

Oslo University Hospital
Hospitals in Oslo
University of Oslo
Defunct health trusts of Norway
Heliports in Norway
Airports in Oslo
Hospitals established in 1887
1887 establishments in Norway
Oslo Municipality